Jeppsson is a surname. Notable people with the surname include:

Frans Jeppsson-Wall (born 1998), Swedish mixed race performer of Swedish and Nigerian-British descent
Håkan Jeppsson (1961–2018), Swedish football chairman for the Swedish club Malmö FF, a post he has held since 2010
Hans Jeppsson or Hasse Jeppson (1925–2013), retired Swedish football striker
Johanna Jeppsson, sidecar passenger in Swedish sidecarcross team Conny and Johanna Strandberg
Kerstin Jeppsson (born 1948), Swedish composer
Peter Jeppsson (born 1968), is a Swedish social democratic politician, member of the Riksdag since 2006

See also
Jephson
Jepsen
Jepson (disambiguation)